Pelican Pointe is a resort village in the Canadian province of Saskatchewan within Census Division No. 6. It is on the shores of Last Mountain Lake in the Rural Municipality of McKillop No. 220.

Pelican Pointe is situated on Pelican Point, across the lake from Little Arm Bay and Last Mountain Lake Indian reserve.

History 
Pelican Pointe incorporated as a resort village on January 1, 1987.

Demographics 

Government 
The Resort Village of Pelican Pointe is governed by an elected municipal council and an appointed clerk. The mayor is Steve Mazurak.

See also 
List of communities in Saskatchewan
List of municipalities in Saskatchewan
List of resort villages in Saskatchewan
List of villages in Saskatchewan
List of summer villages in Alberta

References 

Resort villages in Saskatchewan
McKillop No. 220, Saskatchewan
Division No. 6, Saskatchewan